Arizonacritus is a genus of clown beetles in the family Histeridae. There is one described species in Arizonacritus, A. talayesvai.

References

Further reading

 
 

Histeridae
Articles created by Qbugbot